Loren "The Boss" Ross (September 18, 1964 – July 31, 2013) in Nashville, Tennessee) is a former professional heavyweight boxer.

Amateur career 

Ross won the 1984, 1985, and 1986 United States Amateur Light Heavyweight Championships. This feat was also accomplished by future Heavyweight Champions Cassius Clay known better as Muhammad Ali and Leon Spinks. Spinks, while serving in the United States Marine Corps won three consecutive United States Amateur Light Heavyweight Championships '74, '75 and '76. Lost to Pablo Romero (Cuba) at the World Amateur Championships in 1986 (4–1) for the 178 pound title.

1986 World amateur championships results 
Defeated Markus Bott (West Germany) 5–0
Defeated Nurmagomed Shanavazov (Soviet Union) 5–0
Defeated Deyan Kirilov (Bulgaria) 3–2
Lost to Pablo Romero (Cuba) 1–4, in final (placed 2nd)

Professional career 

Ross had a professional record of 17–2 (12 KOs) with 1 no contest.  Ross won his first 15 fights with 10 of those by KO. Ross' last fight was February 26, 1991 against Bert Cooper. Scheduled for 10 rounds, Cooper scored an 8th round TKO. Ross was hospitalized after the fight. Ross had to give up boxing because of a heart condition, Cooper went on to fight former Heavyweight Champion Evander Holyfield. In 20 fights, he boxed a total of 79 rounds and had a KO% of 60%.

Professional boxing record

|-
|align="center" colspan=8|17 Wins (12 knockouts, 5 decisions), 2 Losses (2 knockouts, 0 decisions), 1 No Contest 
|-
| align="center" style="border-style: none none solid solid; background: #e3e3e3"|Result
| align="center" style="border-style: none none solid solid; background: #e3e3e3"|Record
| align="center" style="border-style: none none solid solid; background: #e3e3e3"|Opponent
| align="center" style="border-style: none none solid solid; background: #e3e3e3"|Type
| align="center" style="border-style: none none solid solid; background: #e3e3e3"|Round
| align="center" style="border-style: none none solid solid; background: #e3e3e3"|Date
| align="center" style="border-style: none none solid solid; background: #e3e3e3"|Location
| align="center" style="border-style: none none solid solid; background: #e3e3e3"|Notes
|-align=center
|Loss
|
|align=left| "Smokin" Bert Cooper
|TKO
|8
|26/02/1991
|align=left| Birmingham, Alabama, United States
|align=left|
|-
|Win
|
|align=left| Robert "Bobby" Thomas
|KO
|2
|08/02/1991
|align=left| La Vergne, Tennessee, United States
|align=left|
|-
|Win
|
|align=left| Melton Bowen
|TKO
|3
|20/01/1991
|align=left| Atlantic City, New Jersey, United States
|align=left|
|-
|Loss
|
|align=left| Tony Willis
|TKO
|7
|08/11/1990
|align=left| Las Vegas, Nevada, United States
|align=left|
|-
|Win
|
|align=left|Lamar Johnson
|KO
|1
|21/08/1990
|align=left| Raleigh, North Carolina, United States
|align=left|
|-
|Win
|
|align=left| Danny Blake
|UD
|4
|30/07/1990
|align=left| Chicago, Illinois, United States
|align=left|
|-
|No Contest
|
|align=left| Dave Slaughter
|NC
|2
|15/06/1990
|align=left| Georgetown, Kentucky, United States
|align=left|
|-
|Win
|
|align=left| Trent Surratt
|PTS
|6
|21/04/1990
|align=left| Bristol, Tennessee, United States
|align=left|
|-
|Win
|
|align=left| Arthur "Stormy" Weathers
|TKO
|8
|20/03/1990
|align=left| Nashville, Tennessee, United States
|align=left|
|-
|Win
|
|align=left| John Swafford
|KO
|1
|17/02/1990
|align=left| Bristol, Tennessee, United States
|align=left|
|-
|Win
|
|align=left| Michael Greer
|PTS
|10
|26/12/1989
|align=left| Memphis, Tennessee, United States
|align=left|
|-
|Win
|
|align=left| Danny Wofford
|TKO
|3
|21/11/1989
|align=left| Nashville, Tennessee, United States
|align=left|
|-
|Win
|
|align=left| Trent Surratt
|UD
|8
|25/10/1989
|align=left| Nashville, Tennessee, United States
|align=left|
|-
|Win
|
|align=left|Billy "The Kid" Moore
|KO
|4
|30/09/1989
|align=left| La Vergne, Tennessee, United States
|align=left|
|-
|Win

|
|align=left| Tony "Wooden" Nichols
|KO
|1
|05/09/1989
|align=left| Memphis, Tennessee, United States
|align=left|
|-
|Win
|
|align=left|Tony Best
|KO
|1
|31/08/1989
|align=left| Memphis, Tennessee, United States
|align=left|
|-
|Win
|
|align=left|Larry "Cable Guy" Anderson
|TKO
|1
|11/07/1989
|align=left| Memphis, Tennessee, United States
|align=left|
|-
|Win
|
|align=left| Rocky Bentley
|PTS
|6
|24/06/1989
|align=left| Memphis, Tennessee, United States
|align=left|
|-
|Win
|
|align=left| Robert Raglin Strickland
|KO
|2
|22/05/1989
|align=left| Bowling Green, Kentucky, United States
|align=left|
|-
|Win
|
|align=left| Arthur Pruitt
|TKO
|1
|16/05/1989
|align=left| Nashville, Tennessee, United States
|align=left|
|}

External links

References 

Boxers from Tennessee
1964 births
Living people
People from Nashville, Tennessee
American male boxers
Heavyweight boxers